Torso is a true crime limited series graphic novel written by Brian Michael Bendis and Marc Andreyko, with art and lettering by Brian Michael Bendis. It is based on the true story of the Cleveland Torso Murderer, and the efforts of the famous lawman Eliot Ness and his band of the "Unknowns" to capture him.

Bendis was initially inspired to write the novel after reading the files about the murders. As a Cleveland native, Bendis wrote the novel to pay homage to his hometown. Together with co-writer Andreyko, they crafted the comic with various historical photographs and clippings from the era. After its release, the graphic novel was critically well-received by the comic book community and elevated Bendis' career in the industry. The graphic novel was originally published by Image Comics and later reprinted under Marvel's Icon imprint. Since then, various attempts to adapt the novel into film have been proposed.

Publication history
Torso was originally published as a six-issue limited series by Image Comics. Bendis envisioned the comic as a historical true story which he turned into a graphic novel. Torso was written during Bendis' time as a struggling writer in his hometown Cleveland. His inspiration came while working as a cartoonist in the Cleveland Plain Dealer, where his editor gave him access to the Cleveland Torso Murders files. The files contained all of the visual evidences and testimonies, such as photographs, interviews and newspaper excerpts for Bendis to create the novel. His particular inspiration was that of a picture of a coroner examining a dismembered leg with a magnifying glass, which he described as "the opposite of CSI." Besides the archives, Bendis and Mark also took information from Eliot Ness' own written interviews. He surmised their work during an interview:

In creating the atmosphere of the comic, Marc used historical photographs and documents combined with his black-and-white artwork to tell a unique noir-like story. Bendis and Andreyko presented their story in a straightforward cinematic fashion, with the occasional use of silent and repeated panels and sparse dialogue to create tension. The use of photography and clippings in the comic is also focused upon, with Marc's intention of presenting it like a film comic, creating a tone of realism. Bendis also provided the art and lettering, as well as his trademark "sharp and contrast" dialogue he would later use in his future projects.

Synopsis
Torso tells the story of the real life "Torso Murderer", a serial killer who was active during 1934 to 1938. He received his nickname because he left only the torsos of his victims. Without fingerprints or dental records, these victims were very difficult to identify in a time before DNA testing. The investigator on the case was Eliot Ness, Cleveland Safety Director and former head of the Untouchables.

Collected editions
The series was collected in a trade paperback, Torso: A True Crime Graphic Novel, in 2001, and also published by Image. Marvel Comics reformatted and reprinted the comic book in its Icon imprint in March 2012.

Reception and awards
After its release, Torso was met with critical acclaim from both critics and consumers alike. The graphic novel won the 1999 Eisner Award for "Comic Book Excellence, Talent Deserving of Wider Recognition". Torso was nominated for an International Horror Guild award for best graphic story and for 3 International Eagle Awards. The graphic novel elevated both Bendis and Marc's careers in the comic book industry, which soon led Bendis being discovered and recruited by Marvel as well as solidifying his reputation as a crime writer. Comic Book Resources called it "one of the great crime comics of the late 20th century".

Today, the graphic novel is considered one of the best of its genre. Comics Alliance listed the graphic novel in its "8 of the Best Noir Comics", calling it "an engaging and — unsurprisingly — genuinely creepy story". Top Tenz ranked in at #4 in its list "Top 10 Crime Comics", describing it as a "stunning and chilling examination of one of America’s great unsolved crime sprees". Jesse Schedeen from IGN ranked Torso at #5 in her "9 Great Murder Mystery Comics", stating that it "used these real-world events to weave a great mystery with a dramatic climax".

Film
In January 2006, Variety reported that director David Fincher would be directing a film version of Torso for Miramax. The producers were Bill Mechanic, Don Murphy, Todd McFarlane and Terry Fitzgerald. Screenwriter Ehren Kruger was set to adapt the series. In a September 2009 unedited episode of Fanboy Radio, Bendis confirmed the Torso film has been canceled by Miramax and the rights have reverted to Bendis. The story of the failed attempt to make the film was told in Bendis's autobiographical graphic novel, Fortune and Glory.

In 2013, new plans for an adaptation was greenlit, with David Lowery hired to write and direct the film. Bendis said that while the projects had its ups and downs over the last 15 years, he’s never lost belief in its cinematic potential.

In March 2017, director Paul Greengrass was hired to direct and produce Ness for Paramount Pictures with producers John Davis, Greg Goodman and John Fox producing from Davis Entertainment with David Engel from Circle of Confusion. Screenwriter Brian Helgeland was set to write the script.

Notes

References

Comics by Brian Michael Bendis
Comics by Marc Andreyko
Comic book limited series
Crime comics
True crime
Horror comics
Comics set in the 1930s
Comics based on real people
1998 comics debuts
Eisner Award winners
Works about serial killers